Ramesh Chandra Jain (born 8 June 1949) is a scientist and entrepreneur in the field of information and computer science. He is a Bren Professor in Information & Computer Sciences, Donald Bren School of Information and Computer Sciences, University of California, Irvine.

Education 
He graduated with a bachelor's degree from Visvesvaraya National Institute of Technology, Nagpur, India and has a Ph.D. in electronics engineering (1975) from Indian Institute of Technology, Kharagpur, India.

Career 
Ramesh Jain has been a researcher, an entrepreneur, and an educator. His activities have been mostly in the areas of Computer Vision, Artificial Intelligence, Multimedia and using these to build real world systems.

He served in academic positions at many universities. He served as a professor of computer science and engineering at the University of Michigan, Ann Arbor and the University of California, San Diego; in each case he founded and directed artificial intelligence and visual information systems labs. He served as Farmer Professor at Georgia Tech from 2002-2004. In 2005 he was named the first Bren Professor in Information and Computer Science for the Donald Bren School of Information and Computer Sciences, University of California, Irvine.

His research interests started in cybernetic systems. That interest brought him to research in pattern recognition, computer vision. and artificial intelligence. He was the coauthor of the first computer vision paper addressing analysis of real video sequence of a traffic scene. After working on several aspects of computer vision systems and coauthoring a text book in machine vision, he realized that to solve hard computer vision problem one must include all other available information from other signals and contextual sources. This realization resulted in his becoming active in developing multimedia computing systems. His contributions to developing visual information management systems influenced many researchers. He also participated in developing concept of immersive as well as multiple perspective interactive videos, to use multiple video cameras to build three dimensional video where a person can decide what they want to experience. His research in multimedia computing convinced him that experiences are central human knowledge acquisition and use, resulting in his interest in 'experiential computing' Since 2012, he has been engaged in developing a navigational approach to guide people in their lifestyle for achieving their personal health goals. Since food is one of the most important component of human lifestyle and is so central to all aspects of human society, he is working with several international researchers in the area of food computing 

He founded or co-founded multiple startup companies including Imageware, Virage, Praja, and Seraja. Virage is considered the first company to address photo and video management applications that have become central to human experience in digital world. He served as Chairman of ACM SIG Multimedia.

He was the founding Editor-in-Chief of IEEE MultiMedia magazine and the Machine Vision and Applications journal. He still serves on the editorial boards of several journals. He has been elected a Fellow of the Association for Computing Machinery (ACM), the Institute of Electrical and Electronics Engineers (IEEE), the International Association for Pattern Recognition (IAPR), the Association for the Advancement of Artificial Intelligence (AAAI), American Association for Advancement of Science (AAAS), and the Society for Optics and Photonics Technology (SPIE). He has published over 400 research papers in scientific journals and conferences.

Publications 
 Publications by Ramesh Jain
 Ramesh talks about Eventweb 
 Presentation on Next Generation Search by Ramesh Jain

References

External links 
 Interview with Gartner
 Ramesh talks about Eventweb 
 Paper on Context-Aware Multimedia Experiences

1949 births
Living people
American Jains
American computer scientists
University of California, Irvine faculty
Fellows of the Association for Computing Machinery
Fellow Members of the IEEE
Fellows of the Association for the Advancement of Artificial Intelligence
University of Michigan faculty
American people of Indian descent
American businesspeople
Scientists from Nagpur
Fellows of the International Association for Pattern Recognition
Fellows of SPIE